VBirds were a British virtual girl group, created in 2002 by a team of designers, producers and musicians. An animated television series of the same name, consisting of six one-minute episodes, aired on Cartoon Network between long-form programming. The band's only single, "Virtuality", was released on Liberty Records and reached No. 21 in the UK Singles Chart in early 2003. A spin-off series of dance tutorials, VBirds: Perfect, aired in 2003. Despite its success as a promotional tool to keep young viewers watching during ad breaks, no further singles were released.

The band's backstory revolved around them being exiled from their home planet of Planet V by its ruler, King He:Lin, for refusing to participate in the dance farms on their planet. They were shrunk down in size and put into a dance machine which was launched from the planet down to Earth, so the humans could play with them as long as they wanted. The story concluded with He:Lin's echoing words "Enjoy yourselves while you can, VBirds. For you will never escape your dance machine prison!"

The VBirds were interviewed on SMTV Live. In the interview, Bling and Wow compare their music to that of fellow girl groups Destiny's Child, Mis-Teeq and the Sugababes.

Members
Boom is perhaps the most witty and energetic member of the group, although she can also be very bad tempered. Boom is able to create and throw pulsating balls of colour by blowing a kiss into her hand. This gives her a knack for decoration.
Wow  is the most mature VBird. Her powers calm those around her, allowing her to keep most arguments under control.
Bling is the most fashionable of the girls and can easily show it by using her powers to create new costumes for the group in an instant. Although this ability comes in handy for the group during performances, she prefers to use it in her free time to annoy the other girls.
D:Lin is the youngest in the group, and with green skin she stands out more than the other VBirds. D:Lin loves nothing more than DJing whenever the group is not performing, and she also uses records as throwing weapons whenever the situation calls for it.

Single

"Virtuality" is the group's only single. It includes the B-side "Dance With Me", which samples the Woo! Yeah! portion of "Think (About It)" by Lyn Collins and vocals from "Virtuality". A music video for "Virtuality" was also released and included in select versions of the CD single.

Legacy
"Virtuality" is featured in Dancing Stage Fever.

References

External links

Musical groups established in 2002
Musical groups disestablished in 2003
2002 establishments in the United Kingdom
2003 disestablishments in the United Kingdom
2002 British television series debuts
2002 British television series endings
2000s British animated television series
2000s British children's television series
2000s British music television series
2000s British science fiction television series
British children's animated musical television series
British children's animated science fiction television series
Cartoon Network original programming
Animated musical groups
British electronic music groups
British women in electronic music
British funk musical groups
British pop girl groups
British soul musical groups
Fictional extraterrestrial characters
Fictional musical groups